The Newcastle and Hunter Rugby Union is one of Australia's oldest rugby union organisations, with a history dating back to the mid 19th century. The union is based in Newcastle, New South Wales, Australia.

History
The earliest report of a football match in Newcastle was in 1860, when 'a lover of the old English games has offered one of Mrs. O’Hagan's most fashionable bonnets as a prize to the fortunate party who shall give the winning (final) kick in a game of foot-ball, to be played on the new cricket ground, near St. John's Church.  On 5 June 1869, the Volunteer Artillery team (8 players) challenged United Cricket Club (11 Players) to a football match. The game was played over two weekends in Centennial Park (currently Lowlands Bowling Club). The first recorded football club playing to the 'rugby rules'  in the district was the Albion Football Club, established in 1872 in West Maitland. On 1 May 1877, a meeting at 'Ship Inn' saw the foundation of Newcastle Football Club. 1877 also saw the formation of the Wallsend Club.

A precursor to the formation of a local union, the Raysmith Challenge Cup was commenced in 1887 and was contested by Newcastle, Waratah, Advance, Orientals, Union, Ferndale, West Maitland, Raymond Terrace, East Maitland Imperial, Singleton and East Maitland clubs. In 1888, a meeting of Newcastle, Advance, West Maitland, Union and Ferndale Clubs saw a branch of the Southern Rugby Football (later NSWRU in 1892) established, this was known as the Northern Branch. This was the formation of what would become the Newcastle Rugby Union. Early clubs in the competition included Advance (1880); West Maitland (1885); Oriental (1885); Union (1885); Ferndale (1885); Waratah (1885); Raymond Terrace (1886); Carlton (1887); Centennial (1887); Lambton (1888); Wickham Albion (1888) and Greta (1890).

In 1911, the Northern Branch disbanded but was reformed in 1912 to be known as the Newcastle Rugby Union. During 1915–1924, little rugby was played due to World War I and its aftermath. After a match between Great Public Schools Old Boys and Newcastle High School Old Boys at Empire Park in 1924, a decision was made to reform the Newcastle Rugby Union; this was beginning of the current Premier Rugby Competition. The 1925 competition comprised Cook's Hill Old Boys, Newcastle High School Old Boys, Great Public Schools' Old Boys (later re-named Wanderers), Lysaght's Limited, Northern Suburbs and Mayfield.

Discontent with the focus of district rugby (introduced in 1899) saw the establishment of the Hunter District Rugby Union in 1900. The initial competition comprised the East End, West End, Morpeth, Millers Forest, Branxton and Singleton clubs. Seniors competition continued until 1916, when suspended due to a shortage of players as a result of the War. But the HDRU continued to foster rugby football through the Cadets Competition. In 1996, the Hunter Valley Zone amalgamated with Newcastle to form the current Newcastle and Hunter Rugby Union.

 List of clubs 

 First-grade clubs 

  Hamilton Hawks
  Merewether Carlton Rugby Club
  Maitland
  Nelson Bay
  University of Newcastle
  Singleton
  Southern Beaches
  Wanderers

 Lower-grade clubs 

  Griffins
  Lake Macquarie
  Muswellbrook
  Pokolbin

Current club details
The Newcastle and Hunter Rugby Union now consists of 20 clubs across 3 Divisions plus a women's competition. There is a junior competition (Hunter Junior Rugby Union) accommodating age groups 7 through to 18.

 EastsNickname: Easts
Colours: Gold, White and Navy
Home Ground: Dangar Park, Mayfield (the spiritual home of rugby in Newcastle)
Joined competition: 1946
Premierships:1954, 1987, 1990 (tied), 2000, 2004 (5)
 HamiltonNickname: Hawks
Colours: Blue and Gold
Home Ground: Passmore Oval, Wickham
Joined competition: 1968
Premierships:1978, 1982, 1990 (tied), 2002, 2008, 2010, 2012, 2015, 2016, 2017, 2018, 2019 (12)
 Lake Macquarie(formerly known as Boolaroo)
Nickname: Roos (formally Bulls)
Colours: Yellow, Maroon and Dark Blue
Home Ground: Walters Park, Boolaroo
Joined competition:
Premierships: 0
 MaitlandNickname: Blacks
Colours: Black, with white trim
Home Ground: Marcellin Park, Lorn
Joined competition:
Premierships: 1969, 1974(tied), 1976, 1977, 1983, 1991, 1994, 1998, 1999.(9)
 Merewether CarltonNickname: Greens
Colours: Dark green and white
Home Ground: Townson Oval, Merewether
Joined competition:
Premierships: 1947, 1958, 1973, 1974 (tied), 1979 (tied), 1980, 1989, 2007, 2011, 2022 (10)
 Nelson BayNickname: Gropers
Colours: Blue, Black and White
Home Ground: Strong Oval, Nelson Bay
Joined competition:
Premierships: 0
 SingletonNickname: Bulls
Colours: Red and Black
Home Ground: Rugby Park, Howe St Singleton.
Joined competition: 1990
Premierships:1992, 1995, 1996, 1997 (4)
 Southern BeachesNickname: Beaches
Colours: Blue and Yellow
Home Ground: Alan Davis Field, Gateshead
Joined competition: 2007
Premierships: 0
 UniversityNickname: Students
Colours: Maroon and White
Home Ground: University Oval No 1.
Joined competition: 1957 in first grade (1955 in the lower grades)
Premierships: 1959, 1961, 1962, 1966, 1984, 1985, 1986, 1988 (8)
 WanderersNickname: Two Blues
Colours: Sky blue and Royal blue
Home Ground: No. 2 Sports ground, Newcastle West
Joined competition:
Premierships: 1945, 1949, 1955, 1956, 1960, 1963, 1964, 1965, 1975, 1981, 1993, 2001, 2005, 2009, 2014 (15)
 The Waratahs'
Nickname: Waratah
Colours: Red, with white trim
Home Ground: Waratah Oval
Joined competition: 1944
Premierships:1946, 1950, 1951, 1952, 1953, 1957, 1967, 1968, 1970, 1971, 1972, 1979 (tied), 2003, 2006, 2013 (15)

Clubs competing in the lower First & Second Division competitions include:

 Cessnock Coalfields
 Cooks Hill Brown Snakes
 East Maitland Eagles
 Newcastle Griffins
 Medowie Marauders

 Muswellbrook Heelers
 Newcastle Dragons
 Pokolbin Reds
 Singleton Army Lions
 Southern Lakes Hammerheads

Premiers
First grade premiers (1945 onwards):

Notes: *Tie for Premiership

Grand Final Results (from 2000–present)

Recent Premier 1 Rugby Finals Series

2022 season

2019 season

2018 season

2017 season

2016 Finals

2015 Finals

2014 Finals

2013 Finals

2012 Finals

Test representatives
The following players have played a Rugby Union Test for Australia. The first player from the Newcastle region to represent Australia was C.J.B. White from the Maitland Club in 1899.
 Neil Adams (Noodles) (1925–1986) Merewether Carlton – 1 test
 Cyril Burke (1925–) Merewether Carlton / The Waratahs – 26 Tests
 Walter Cobb (1870–1933) Centennial – 2 Tests
 Michael Cocks (1945 -) Brisbane Waters – 10 Tests
 Terrence Curley (1938–2017) Wanderers – 11 Tests
 Declan Curran (1952 -) The Waratahs – 4 Tests
 Michael Fitzgerald (1955 -) The Waratahs
 William Gardner (1929 -) Newcastle – 1 Test
 Ronald Harvey (1933 -) The Waratahs – 2 Tests
 Phil Hawthorne (1943–1994) Wanderers – 21 Tests
 John Hipwell (1948–2013) The Waratahs – 35 Tests
 Peter Horton (1945 -) The Waratahs – 21 Tests
 Michael Jenkinson (1940 -) Wanderers
 Hubert Jones (1888–1919) North Newcastle – 3 Tests
 Alexander MacNeill (1947 -) Newcastle Referees Assoc – 16 Tests
 Sydney Malcolm (1903 -) South Newcastle – 12 Tests
 John Marshall (1926 -) The Waratahs – 1 Test
 Ronald Meadows (Twinkletoes) Wanderers – 6 Tests
 Steve Merrick (1968 -) Singleton – 2 Tests
 Dr. Herbert Moran (Paddy) (1885–1945) Newcastle – 1 Test
 Joshua Stevenson (1883 – ?) South Newcastle
 Dominic Vaughan (1960 -) The Waratahs – 5 Tests
 Patrick Walsh (1879–1953) Carlton – 3 Tests
 Keith Walsham (1941 -) University – 2 Tests
 Charlie White (1874–1941) Maitland – 3 Tests

See also

Rugby union in New South Wales
List of Australian club rugby union competitions

References

Sources
 Newcastle and Hunter Rugby Union website

External links
NHRU official website

Club websites

 Cessnock Coalfields
Cooks Hill Brown Snakes
Hamilton Hawks
Lake Macquarie Roos
Maitland RC
Medowie Marauders

Merewether Carlton
Muswellbrook Heelers
Nelson Bay Gropers
Newcasltle Griffins
Pokolbin Reds
Singleton Bulls

Southern Beaches
Southern Lakes Hammerheads
University of Newcastle RUFC
Wanderers
The Waratahs RUFC

Sport in Newcastle, New South Wales
Rugby union governing bodies in New South Wales
Sports organizations established in 1888
Organisations based in Newcastle, New South Wales